Kingsland, also known as Richmond View, was a historic plantation house located at Chimney Corner, Chesterfield County, Virginia.  It was built about 1805, and consisted of a -story, frame structure with a rear ell.  The main section measured 20 feet by 40 feet and the rear ell extended 55 feet. The house featured a center chimney.  Also on the property was a contributing smokehouse. It was moved and reconstructed in 1994.

It was listed on the National Register of Historic Places in 1975.

References

Plantation houses in Virginia
Houses on the National Register of Historic Places in Virginia
Houses completed in 1805
Houses in Chesterfield County, Virginia
National Register of Historic Places in Chesterfield County, Virginia
1805 establishments in Virginia